Holy Redeemer Church may refer to:

Belize 
Holy Redeemer Cathedral

India 
 Basilica of the Holy Redeemer, Tiruchirappalli

Ireland 
Holy Redeemer Church, Bray

Thailand 
 Holy Redeemer Church, Bangkok

United Kingdom 
Holy Redeemer Church, York
Our Most Holy Redeemer, Clerkenwell, London
 Church of Our Most Holy Redeemer and St Thomas More, Chelsea, London

United States 
Most Holy Redeemer Church, San Francisco
Old Holy Redeemer Catholic Church (Kissimmee, Florida)
Most Holy Redeemer Church (Detroit, Michigan)
Holy Redeemer Church (Eagle Harbor, Michigan)
Holy Redeemer College (Oakland, California), built as a seminary in 1925.